Ropaži is a village in Latvia, the administrative centre of Ropaži Municipality. The village located approximately 36 km from the capital Riga.

References

Ropaži Municipality
Towns and villages in Latvia
Kreis Riga